Your Honour is an Indian television series that aired on DD National in 2000. The series created by Kavita Chaudhary and was about aspiring lawyers, Kaushalya (Kavita Chaudhary) and Vikas (Aliraza Namdar), as well as police inspector Sooraj (Sachin Khedekar).

Cast
 Kavita Chaudhary as Kaushalya
 Sachin Khedekar as Sooraj
 Aliraza Namdar as Vikas
 Govind Namdev
 Manoj Joshi
 Ashok Lokhande

References 

DD National original programming
2000 Indian television series debuts
2001 Indian television series endings